Roger Heman (March 28, 1932 – November 13, 1989) was an American sound engineer. He won an Academy Award for Best Sound and was nominated for another one in the same category. His father was also a sound engineer and also won an Academy Award, for Best Effects, Special Effects for Crash Dive.

Heman Jr. died of lung cancer at the age of 57.

Awards and nominations
 Won an Academy Award for Jaws (1975), shared with Robert L. Hoyt, Earl Madery and John Carter
 Nominated for an Academy Award for Coal Miner's Daughter (1980), shared with Richard Portman and Jim Alexander
 Nominated for a BAFTA Award for Best Sound for Coal Miner's Daughter, shared with Gordon Ecker, Richard Portman and James Alexander
 Nominated for a Primetime Emmy for Outstanding Achievement in Film Sound Mixing for the 1970 TV movie My Sweet Charlie, shared with John Stransky Jr., Melvin M. Metcalfe Sr. and Clarence Self

References

External links

1932 births
1989 deaths
American audio engineers
Best Sound Mixing Academy Award winners
Deaths from lung cancer
20th-century American engineers